Jamal Akachar (born 14 October 1982 in Breda) is a retired Dutch-Moroccan footballer.

Club career
He started his career for Ajax, where he made his debut against FC Groningen on 1 September 2002 while still an amateur and making a living as a taxi-driver. In July 2004 he left Ajax and moved to SC Cambuur and after 3 years in Leeuwarden he was released by the club after he spent a night in jail for alleged embezzlement. He signed in January 2008 a 3-year contract by Moghreb Tétouan, but returned to the Netherlands after the club failed to pay his wages.

References

External links
 Career stats - Voetbal International 

1982 births
Living people
Dutch footballers
Moroccan footballers
AFC Ajax players
SC Cambuur players
Eredivisie players
Eerste Divisie players
Footballers from Breda
Dutch sportspeople of Moroccan descent
Moghreb Tétouan players
Expatriate footballers in Morocco
Association football midfielders
Dutch taxi drivers